Xambioá is a municipality in the state of Tocantins in the Northern region of Brazil.

The municipality contains 43% of the  Lago de Santa Isabel Environmental Protection Area, created in 2002.

See also
List of municipalities in Tocantins

References

Municipalities in Tocantins